The A-3170 (LS-1200) is a diesel-electric switching locomotive built between May 1950 and August 1951, by the Lima-Hamilton Corporation of Lima, Ohio, United States. Lima's original design was the A-3080, a 1,000 hp (750 kW) switcher, which became the standard for Lima's designs. A 660 hp (490 kW) switcher (proposed specification number A-3081) had also been designed at the request of American Rolling Mill Company, but none were built. By changing fuel rack settings, the A-3080 was upgraded to the A-3170 producing 1,200 horsepower (890 kW) from a turbocharged Hamilton T89SA four-stroke, eight cylinder inline diesel engine, a Westinghouse generator and 4 Westinghouse traction motors provided the 74,508 lbf (331.43 kN) of tractive effort.

Lima-Hamilton did not assign model numbers to their models but referred to them by specification numbers. Model designations such as LS-1200 were a railfan invention. Lima-Hamilton assigned A-3170 as the specification number for this particular unit. The Southern Pacific ordered 60 locomotives but agreed to receive 84 S12s from BLH instead.

Original owners

Preservation
Two A-3170’s are preserved:
ARMCO Steel E-110, the final locomotive produced by Lima- Hamilton, at the Illinois Railway Museum.
Baltimore and Ohio 320, at the Whitewater Valley Railroad.

References 

Lima diesel locomotives
B-B locomotives
Railway locomotives introduced in 1950
Standard gauge locomotives of the United States
Baltimore and Ohio locomotives
Erie Railroad locomotives
New York Central Railroad locomotives
New York, New Haven and Hartford Railroad locomotives
Nickel Plate Road locomotives